"Go Fish" is episode 20 of season two of the television series Buffy the Vampire Slayer. It was written by David Fury and Elin Hampton, directed by David Semel, and first broadcast on May 5, 1998.

Plot 
Buffy arrives at school in a car with Cameron, a member of the Razorbacks swim team. He makes persistent and unwelcome sexual advances, so Buffy slams his head against the steering wheel. Giles informs Buffy that the remains of Dodd, another swim team-member, were found on the beach after a party. The Scooby Gang try to determine what killed him. Xander bumps into Cameron, who rubs his elite status in Xander's face. After Cameron goes to the cafeteria for a snack, Xander hears him scream. Investigating, Xander finds: a ransacked cafeteria; Cameron's skin; a gill monster (humanoid sea-creature).

In the library, Cordelia sketches the creature that Xander saw. Buffy and Willow return, having been informed that Cameron and Dodd were the Razorbacks' two best swimmers; after them was Gage. Having little else to go on, Buffy shadows Gage as the potential next target. At the Bronze that night, Gage confronts Buffy about her following him; she tells him that he may be in danger. He does not believe her and leaves, only to be attacked by Angelus in the parking lot. Buffy fights off the vampire, noting as she does that Angelus was spitting out Gage's blood rather than drinking it.

The following day, Buffy and Willow and Cordelia sit in on swim practice. They discuss Angelus' behavior, and speculate that the swim team may be taking steroids—which repel vampires, but attract gill monsters. Xander joins the swim team in order to get information from places the girls would not have access to.

Buffy hears Gage cry out in pain; she finds him and a teammate in the locker room, transforming into two more of the creatures. Both monsters attack and wound Buffy; just in time, Marin enters and chases them off. Buffy and Giles tell Coach Marin that members of his team are not being killed by the creatures, but are transforming into them. Meanwhile, Xander tries to find out what drug his teammates are taking, and how to get it. He finds out that the "steroids" are being pumped in with the sauna-steam; Xander is inhaling it as they speak.

It is revealed that Nurse Greenliegh is a co-conspirator with Marin; they have been conducting experiments on the swim team with fish DNA, in order to enhance the Razorbacks' performance. When Nurse Greenliegh insists they end the experiments, Marin forces her into an open grate leading to the sewers. The creatures attack and kill her.

Buffy confronts Marin, but he forces her at gunpoint into the sewer. She is fighting the gill monsters when Xander enters, disarms and knocks out Marin. Xander just has time to rescue Buffy from the sewer before Marin revives and bashes Xander's head in with a large wrench. Marin swings at Buffy next but misses and falls into the sewer. Being no match for the gill monsters in their own element, Buffy can only look on from above as Marin's own creatures rip him to pieces. Xander and the surviving Razorbacks are given treatments to undo the effects of the inhaled mutagen. Meanwhile, the fully-transformed gill monsters head off to the open ocean, never to be seen again.

Themes 
"Go Fish" is an example of a Buffy episode showing negative consequences for drug use.
It also includes the recurrent theme of Buffy's prospective boyfriends turning out to be monsters.

References

External links

 

Buffy the Vampire Slayer (season 2) episodes
1998 American television episodes
Television episodes written by David Fury
Fish in popular culture
Television episodes about drugs
Swimming mass media
Television episodes about genetic engineering